Stephen Richard Lawsell Long (born 19 January 1951) is a former English cricketer and field hockey player.  In cricket, Long was a left-handed batsman who bowled leg break.  He was born in Bury St Edmunds, West Suffolk.

Long made his debut for Suffolk in the 1974 Minor Counties Championship against Buckinghamshire.  He played Minor counties cricket for Suffolk from 1974 to 1980, which included 34 Minor Counties Championship appearances.  He made his List A debut against Buckinghamshire in the 1979 Gillette Cup.  In this match, he was dismissed for 5 runs by Raymond Bond.  He made a further List A appearance against Sussex in the 2nd round of the same competition.  In this match, he scored 7 runs before being dismissed by Colin Wells.

He later played Minor Counties Championship cricket for Dorset in 1984, making 7 appearances and a single MCCA Knockout Trophy match.  Outside of cricket, he played field hockey for Suffolk, Dorset, England and Great Britain.

References

External links
Stephen Long at ESPNcricinfo
Stephen Long at CricketArchive

1951 births
Living people
Sportspeople from Bury St Edmunds
English cricketers
Suffolk cricketers
Dorset cricketers
English male field hockey players